The Incomparable Bola Sete is an album by Brazilian guitarist Bola Sete, released in 1964 through Fantasy Records. In 2004, it was reissued on CD on the anthology Voodoo Village.

Track listing

Release history

Personnel 
Monty Budwig – bass
Paul Horn – flute
Nick Martinez – drums
Johnny Rae – drums
Bola Sete – guitar

References

External links 
 

1964 albums
Bola Sete albums
Fantasy Records albums